Togetherness is the fifth studio album by Los Angeles, California -based band, L.T.D., released in 1978 on the A&M label.

Commercial performance
The album peaked at No. 3 on the R&B albums chart. It also reached No. 18 on the Billboard 200. The album features the singles "Holding On (When Love Is Gone)", which peaked at No. 1 on the Hot Soul Singles chart and No. 49 on the Billboard Hot 100 chart, and "We Both Deserve Each Other's Love", which charted at No. 19 on the Hot Soul Singles chart.

Track listing

Personnel
Jeffrey Osborne – lead vocals, background vocals, percussion, drums (tracks 2-3, 6-7, 10)
Lorenzo Carnegie – alto saxophone, tenor saxophone, flute
Henry E. Davis – bass, clavinet on "It's Time to Be Real", background vocals
James E. Davis – piano, acoustic piano, electric piano, clavinet, celeste, background vocals
John T. McGhee – electric guitar, acoustic guitar
Abraham J. "Onion" Miller, Jr. – tenor saxophone, baritone saxophone
Billy Osborne – organ, piano, acoustic piano, electric piano, clavinet, percussion, drums on "Together Forever", orchestra bells, background vocals
Jake Riley – trombone
Carle W. Vickers – trumpet, flugelhorn, soprano saxophone, bass, flute

Guest musicians
Benorce Blackmon – electric guitar, acoustic guitar
Melvin D. Webb – percussion, drums (tracks 1, 4-5, 8) 
Paul Shure – string concertmaster

Charts
Album

Singles

References

External links
 

1978 albums
L.T.D. (band) albums
Albums produced by Bobby Martin
Albums arranged by Bobby Martin
A&M Records albums
Albums recorded at Total Experience Recording Studios